Tree is the second studio album by Japanese rock band Sekai no Owari. It was released on January 14, 2015. It debuted at number one on the weekly Oricon Albums Chart, with 247,964 copies sold.

Track listing

References 

2015 albums
Japanese-language albums
Sekai no Owari albums